Hafiz Abdul Mannan Wazirabadi, spelled as Abdul Mannan Wazirabadi or Abdul Manan Wazirabadi (Abdul Mannan Wazirabadi, 1851 AD18 July 1916 AD, 1267 AH - 16 Ramzan 1334 AH) was a religious scholar, jurist, mufassir and muhaddith during British Raaj. He was a well known scholar of hadith of his time. He is also known as Muhaddith Punjab or Ustad-e-Punjab. He was one of the notable leaders of Ahl-i Hadees movement.

Early life and education 
Mannan Wazirabadi was born in 1267 AH, 1851 AD in the village of Karoili in India's Jhelum district. When Mannan Wazirabadi was 8 years old, he contracted conjunctivitis and lost his sight due to this disease. His father name was Mulk Sharfuddin bin Noor Khan who was member of the Awan tribe, a tribe living predominantly in northern, central, and western parts of Punjab. His family was originally from Ghazni and migrated to Punjab and started working in the field of agricultural. His father died when Mannan was twelve years old.

Hafiz Wazirabadi started receiving the Quran and Persian at home from the Maulvi of his village. He went to different places for higher education and finally came to the service of Syed Nazir Hussain Dehlavi in Delhi. Under Syed Nazir, Wazirabadi completed science of hadith and Quranic commentary. During his stay in Delhi, he also met the founder of Darul Uloom Deoband, Muhammad Qasim Nanautavi and other eminent scholars. After completing the tour of hadith, he came to Abdullah Ghaznavi in Amritsar. Ghaznavi seated Mannan Wazirabadi on the pedestal of Hadith. After staying for some time, he came back to Wazirabad. Where he live forever.

Death 
Mannan Wazirabadi died in Wazirabad on 16 Ramadan 1334 AH, 18 July 1916 AD. He is buried in Chowrangi Cemetery near Wazirabad Sialkot Road. On his death, Sanaullah Amritsar had said that today's Imam Bukhari has died.

See also 

 Abdullah Ropari
 Muhammad Ibrahim Mir Sialkoti
Muhammad Sulaiman Salman Mansoorpuri

Notes

References 

 Ustad-e-Punjab (teacher of Punjab), in Urdu Language , by Maulana Majeed Sohadravi, Darussalam Pakistan/Muslim Publication, Lahore.
Hafiz Abdul Manan Wazirabadi, life, services, works, in Urdu Language, by Munir Ahmad Salafi, Publisher: Faran Academy Lahore.
 Shahkar Islami Encyclopedia, Volume 25, Pages 1060–1061, in Urdu Language, by Mehmood Syed Qasim, Publisher- Al-Faisal.

1851 births
1916 deaths
People from Wazirabad
People from Gujranwala District
Atharis
Quranic exegesis scholars
Indian scholars of Islam
Indian Islamic religious leaders
Hashemite people
Ahl-i Hadith people